A Turf Conspiracy is a 1916 sports crime novel by the British-Australian writer Nathaniel Gould. It is set in the world of horse racing.

Film adaptation
In 1918 the novel served as a basis for the British silent film A Turf Conspiracy directed by Frank Wilson.

References

Bibliography
 Goble, Alan. The Complete Index to Literary Sources in Film. Walter de Gruyter, 1999.

1916 British novels
Australian sports novels
Novels set in England
British sports novels
Novels by Nathaniel Gould
British novels adapted into films
Horse racing novels